The 2022 MTV Video Music Awards were held at the Prudential Center in Newark, New Jersey on August 28, 2022. The show was emceed by LL Cool J, Nicki Minaj, and Jack Harlow. Minaj was honored with the Video Vanguard Award, presented to her by her fans. Red Hot Chili Peppers was honored with the Global Icon Award which was presented to them by Cheech & Chong.

Performances

Presenters
Presenters were announced on August 26. Nessa Diab and Kevan Kenney hosted the 90-minute pre-show event, while Tate McRae served as special celebrity correspondent. Murda Beatz acted as the pre-show House DJ.

Pre-show
Kevan Kenney – presented Best Alternative and Best Metaverse Performance
Tate McRae – presented Push Performance of the Year

Main show
Johnny Depp – intermittently appeared throughout the ceremony in pre-recorded segments as the Moon Person
Offset and DJ Khaled – presented Best Collaboration
Avril Lavigne – announced the finalists for Best New Artist and presented the award later in the night
Latto – introduced Blackpink
Lili Reinhart – presented Best Longform Video
Offset – introduced Conan Gray and the Extended Play Stage
Chlöe – introduced Marshmello and Khalid
Jimmy Fallon – presented Album of the Year
Members of Nicki Minaj's fanbase, the Barbz – presented the Video Vanguard Award to Nicki Minaj
Sofia Carson – presented Best K-Pop
Cheech & Chong – introduced the Red Hot Chili Peppers and presented the Global Icon Award to them
Bebe Rexha – presented Video for Good
Blackpink – introduced Anitta
Jack Harlow (emcee) and Druski – introduced Kane Brown
Ashley Graham – presented Best Latin
Dixie D'Amelio – introduced Måneskin
Becky G – presented Best Hip Hop
Dove Cameron – presented Song of Summer
Nicki Minaj (emcee) – presented Artist of the Year
Carmelo Anthony – presented the Artist of the Year award to Bad Bunny at Yankee Stadium
Joel Madden – presented Best Rock
Billy Eichner – introduced Panic! at the Disco
LL Cool J and Nicki Minaj (emcees) – presented Video of the Year

Winners and nominees 
Nominations were announced on July 26, 2022. Jack Harlow, Kendrick Lamar and Lil Nas X had the most nominations with seven each, followed by Doja Cat and Harry Styles having six nominations each. Nominees for Song of Summer, Group of the Year, and Album of the Year were announced on August 19. Voting for Group of the Year and Song of Summer ran from August 22–25 and August 25–27 respectively, while voting for Album of the Year ran from August 27 until the show, via MTV's Instagram stories. After the second round of categories was announced, the nominations for Doja Cat, Harlow and Styles increased to eight each, making them the artists with the most nominations. Harlow was the most awarded nominee with four wins, followed by Lil Nas X, Styles and Taylor Swift having three each.

Winners are listed first and highlighted in bold.

Notes

References 

MTV Video Music
MTV Video Music Awards
MTV Video Music Awards
MTV Video Music Awards ceremonies
2022 in New Jersey